Terence Patrick O'Sullivan (27 November 1936 – 25 April 1997) was a New Zealand rugby union player. A midfield back or wing, O'Sullivan represented  at a provincial level, and was a member of the New Zealand national side, the All Blacks, from 1960 to 1962. He played 16 matches for the All Blacks including four  internationals.

A dairy farmer at Ōkato, O'Sullivan died while tramping on Mount Ruapehu on 25 April 1997, aged 60.

References

1936 births
1997 deaths
Rugby union players from New Plymouth
People educated at St. Patrick's College, Silverstream
New Zealand rugby union players
New Zealand international rugby union players
Taranaki rugby union players
Rugby union centres
Rugby union wings